HMS Ariadne was a  protected cruiser of the Royal Navy, which was launched in 1898, In March 1913, she was converted to a stokers' training ship and in 1917 was converted to a minelayer and assigned to the Nore Command. She was torpedoed and sunk off Beachy Head by the German submarine  (Otto Steinbrinck) on 26 July 1917.

Service history
Ariadne was built by J&G Thompson of Clydebank and launched on 22 April 1898, when she was named by Lady Balfour of Burleigh, wife of Lord Balfour of Burleigh, who served as Secretary of State for Scotland.

North Atlantic service
In March 1902 she was ordered to prepare for service on the North America and West Indies Station, where she would act as flagship to Vice-Admiral Sir Archibald L. Douglas when he took up command on the station in July that year. She was commissioned at Portsmouth on 5 June 1902 by Captain Montague Browning, who was appointed flag captain in command of the ship from the same day. Leaving Portsmouth in early July, she arrived at the station headquarters at Halifax and formally succeed  as flagship to the station on 15 July. In August–September 1902 she visited St Johns, Newfoundland, Quebec City and Charlottetown. In November the same year, she visited the Bermuda headquarters of the station and Trinidad.

Ariadne took part in the naval blockade of Venezuelan ports during the Venezuelan crisis of 1902–1903.

Notes

References

Diadem class at worldwar1.co.uk

 

Diadem-class cruisers
Ships built on the River Clyde
1898 ships
World War I cruisers of the United Kingdom
Ships sunk by German submarines in World War I
World War I shipwrecks in the English Channel
Maritime incidents in 1917